Thirst is an Icelandic film from 2019 directed by Gaukur Úlfarsson and . Björn Leó Brynjarsson wrote the script. The actors are members of Leikhópnum X who have been uploading skits to their YouTube page.

Thirst takes place in a small town, not unlike Reykjavík, where chaos is in the air and strange crimes and brutality seem to be the order of the day. The film is about Hulda, who is suspected of being responsible for her brother's death and is therefore being investigated by Jens the detective. Hulda's mother, who washes down pills with blue Smirnoff in the morning, also believes that she killed her brother. After being released from custody due to insufficient evidence, she has nowhere to go and wanders around until she encounters Hjört, a millennia-old, lonely, gay vampire who helps her bring her brother Steinda back to life with terrible consequences. at the same time as they have to defend themselves from the intrusion of Esther and Birgitta and their cult, which seems to be chasing them.

References

External links 

 

2019 films
Icelandic horror films
2019 LGBT-related films
Vampires in film
2019 horror films
Icelandic LGBT-related films
LGBT-related horror films